Brestnitsa refers to the following places in Bulgaria:

 Brestnitsa, Dobrich Province
 Brestnitsa, Lovech Province